Richard Simon may refer to:

 Richard Simon (priest) (1638–1712), French priest, Oratorian and biblical critic
 Richard Simon (painter) (1898–1993), German expressionist
 Richard L. Simon (1899–1960), American businessman and co-founder of the publishing house Simon & Schuster
 Dick Simon (born 1933), American racing driver 
 Dick Simon (entrepreneur) (born 1953), American entrepreneur, philanthropist, photographer and speaker